The Nemaha River basin includes the areas of the U.S. state of Nebraska below the Platte River basin that drain directly into the Missouri River. The major streams of the drainage include Weeping Water Creek, Muddy Creek, Little Nemaha River, and Big Nemaha River.

The name 'Nemaha' originates in the Ioway-Otoe-Missouria phrase ñí-máha, which means 'water-soil' and refers to the muddy water at corn-planting time.

Discharges

References

External links
 Nemaha Report

Watersheds of the United States
Landforms of Nebraska